Phyteuma is a genus of flowering plants in the family Campanulaceae, native to Europe and Morocco.

The common name is rampion, a name shared with the related plant Campanula rapunculus. Rampion features prominently in some versions of the fairy tale Rapunzel. In the version collected by the Brothers Grimm, it is said that "rapunzel" is the name given to a local variety of rampion.

The species are herbaceous perennial plants, growing to 5–90 cm tall. The leaves are alternate, petiolate, and vary in shape on a single plant, with larger, broader leaves at the base of the stem and smaller, narrower leaves higher up; the leaf margin is serrated. The flowers are produced in dense erect panicles, each flower with a narrow, deeply five-lobed corolla, 1–2 cm or more long), mostly purple, sometimes pale blue, white or pink. The fruit is a capsule containing numerous small seeds.

Species
Phyteuma × adulterinum - Germany, Czech Republic   (P. nigrum × P. spicatum)
Phyteuma betonicifolium - Alps
Phyteuma charmelii - Morocco, Spain, France, Italy
Phyteuma confusum - Austria, Balkans
Phyteuma cordatum  - French and Italian Alps
Phyteuma gallicum - France
Phyteuma globulariifolium - Pyrenees, Alps
Phyteuma hedraianthifolium  Switzerland, northern Italy
Phyteuma hemisphaericum - Spain, France, Switzerland, Germany, Austria
Phyteuma humile - France, Italy
Phyteuma × huteri Murr - Austrian Alps (P. betonicifolium × P. ovatum)
Phyteuma michelii - France, Italy
Phyteuma nigrum - Black rampion - France, Belgium, Germany, Czech Republic, Austria 
Phyteuma × obornyanum - Austrian Alps  (P. confusum × P. globulariifolium)
Phyteuma orbiculare - Round-headed rampion - most of Europe except Ireland, Scandinavia, Greece, Bulgaria
Phyteuma × orbiculariforme - Czech Republic    (P. nigrum × P. orbiculare)
Phyteuma ovatum  - Pyrenees, Alps
Phyteuma persicifolium - Slovenia, Austria, Trentino-Alto Adige, Veneto, Friuli-Venezia Giulia
Phyteuma × pyrenaeum Sennen - French Pyrenees   (P. ovatum × P. spicatum)
Phyteuma rupicola - French Pyrenees   
Phyteuma scheuchzeri - Alps; naturalised in Great Britain
Phyteuma scorzonerifolium Vill. - Alps
Phyteuma serratum Viv. - Corsica
Phyteuma sieberi - Alps
Phyteuma spicatum - Spiked rampion - most of Europe
Phyteuma tetramerum - Carpathians of Romania and Ukraine
Phyteuma vagneri - Carpathians of Romania and Ukraine
Phyteuma zahlbruckneri

References

Campanuloideae
Campanulaceae genera